Sofie Bæk Andersen (born 15 January 1994) is a female Danish handball player who plays for Silkeborg-Voel KFUM.

References
 
 
  
1994 births
Living people
Sportspeople from Aarhus
Danish female handball players